The Building Research Establishment (BRE) is a centre of building science in the United Kingdom, owned by charitable organisation the BRE Trust. It is a former UK government national laboratory that was privatised in 1997. BRE provides research, advice, training, testing, certification and standards for both public and private sector organisations in the UK and abroad. It has its headquarters in Garston, Hertfordshire, England, with regional sites in Glasgow, Swansea, the US, India, the Middle East and China.

Programmes
BRE is now funded with income from commissioned research, commercial programmes and by a number of digital tools for use in the construction sector.
 
BRE's certification arm – BRE Global – is an independent, third-party certification body responsible for sustainability certification schemes such as BREEAM (for buildings and communities), CEEQUAL (for infrastructure), the Home Quality Mark (for housing) and LPCB certification (for fire and security products and services).

BRE's training arm, the BRE Academy provides online and classroom courses on built environment related issues like sustainability, fire, resilience and building information modelling (BIM).

BRE also carries out research and data generation in support of national and international standards and building codes, including the UK building regulations. It also develops its own standards for responsible sourcing (BES 6001), and ethical labour sourcing (BES 6002).

BRE's digital tools include construction waste management tool SMARTWaste and construction health, safety and wellbeing tool YellowJacket. It also has UKAS accredited testing laboratories, and a publishing business in partnership with IHS Press called the BRE Bookshop.

Ownership
The Building Research Establishment is owned by the BRE Trust, a registered charity that works to support research and education in the built environment. All of the profits accrued by BRE are passed to the Trust and are used to fund new research and education programmes designed to meet the Trust's goal of promoting safety and sustainability.

Over the last 20 years the BRE Trust has funded 117 PhDs on a total research programme of £15m, with other funding levered into the sector as a whole from research councils and European Union research sources.

The BRE Trust also financially supports five university Centres of Excellence. One of the first Centres established was at the University of Edinburgh in 2004, a research and education programme on fire safety engineering. The other centres are in Strathclyde (energy utilisation), 
Bath (construction materials), Cardiff (sustainable engineering), and Brasilia (integrated and sustainable communities).

History

BRE was founded in 1921 as the Building Research Board at East Acton as part of the British Civil Service, as an effort to improve the quality of housing in the United Kingdom.

During the Second World War, it was involved in the confidential research and development of the bouncing bomb for use against the Möhne Dam in the Dambusters Raid of 1943 A small scale model of the dam used for testing can still be found at the Centre in Garston, Watford, today.

BRE was a founding member in 1976 of BSRIA, the Building Services Research and Information Association and the UK Green Building Council (UKGBC) in 2007.

Having subsumed a number of other government organisations over the years, including the former Fire Research Station, and the Princes Risborough Laboratory, it was given executive agency status in 1990, before being privatised by the Department for Environment, Transport and the Regions on 19 March 1997.

From 1 January 2013, BRE took over the management of the UK and Ireland chapter of BuildingSMART.

In August 2016, Constructing Excellence merged with BRE, with BRE undertaking to maintain the CE's brands and functions.

Since the Grenfell Tower fire(2017), BRE has been criticised for holding poor fire safety standards, all the while via reviewing cases like that of Grenfell.

See also
Energy efficiency in British housing
BRE Centre for Fire Safety Engineering at The University of Edinburgh
Construction Industry Council
BREEAM
Post War Building Studies
Security Assurance by the Building Research Establishment (SABRE)
Construction Research and Innovation Strategy Panel

References

Bibliography

External links

BRE official website
BREEAM
CEEQUAL
Home Quality Mark
BRE Academy
SMARTWaste
YellowJacket
BRE Bookshop

Building research
Environmental charities based in the United Kingdom
Housing in the United Kingdom
Organizations established in 1920
Privatised executive agencies of the United Kingdom government
Research institutes in Hertfordshire
1920 establishments in England